Rupture is a 1983 Soviet drama film directed by Vladimir Vengerov.

Plot 
The film is based on the eponymous novel by Ivan Goncharov.

Cast 
 Georgi Antonov as Boris Rajsky
 Elena Finogeeva
 Nikolay Kochegarov
 Rimma Markova
 Marina Yakovleva as Marfinka
 Elena Solovey
 Vitaliy Shapovalov
 Nikolay Ivanov
 Tamara Lebedeva
 Oleg Korchikov

References

External links 
 

1983 films
1980s Russian-language films
Soviet drama films
Films based on Russian novels
Films set in Russia
Films shot in Nizhny Novgorod
1983 drama films